Ernest William Roberts (November 22, 1858 – February 27, 1924) was a U.S. Representative from Massachusetts.

Born in East Madison, Maine, Roberts attended the public schools in Chelsea, Massachusetts.
He was graduated from Highland Military Academy, Worcester, Massachusetts, in 1877, and from the law school of Boston University. Roberts was admitted to the bar in 1881 and then practiced in Boston. He served as member of the city council of Chelsea in 1887 and 1888. He served as member of the state House of Representatives in 1894 and 1896. He served in the state Senate in 1897 and 1898.

Roberts was elected as a Republican to the Fifty-sixth and to the eight succeeding Congresses. He represented the 7th Massachusetts congressional district from March 4, 1899, until March 3, 1913, and, after redistricting, represented the 9th Massachusetts congressional district from March 4, 1913 to March 3, 1917. He was chairman of the Committee on Private Land Claims (Sixty-first Congress). He was an unsuccessful candidate in 1916, losing with 16,765 votes to Alvan T. Fuller, another Republican running as an Independent, with 17,079.

Roberts was named a Regent of the Smithsonian Institution December 1913 and reappointed to another term two years later.

After leaving Congress he practiced law in Washington, D.C., until his death on February 27, 1924. He was buried in Woodlawn Cemetery, Everett, Massachusetts.

See also
 119th Massachusetts General Court (1898)

References

Bibliography
Who's who in State Politics, 1908 Practical Politics  (1908) p. 20.

1858 births
1924 deaths
Republican Party members of the Massachusetts House of Representatives
Republican Party Massachusetts state senators
Massachusetts city council members
Boston University School of Law alumni
Smithsonian Institution people
Republican Party members of the United States House of Representatives from Massachusetts
People from Madison, Maine